Synpalamides escalantei is a moth of the family Castniidae. It was described by Jacqueline Y. Miller in 1976, and is known from Mexico.

The length of the forewings 40–45 mm for males and 55–58 mm for females.

References

Castniidae
Moths described in 1976